Elizabeth Omowunmi Tekovi Da-Silva  (born 10 June 1978) is a Nigerian actress and movie producer of Togolese descent featuring predominantly in the Nigerian Yoruba movie industry. In 2016, Da-Silva was nominated for City People Movie Award for Best Supporting Actress of the Year (Yoruba) at City People Entertainment Awards and in 2018, won the award for Best Actress in a Supporting Role at Best of Nollywood Awards.

Early life and education
Da-Silva was born to Togolese parents residing in Nigeria. She was precisely born in a geographical area known as Obalende in Lagos State where her parents resided and where she spent her childhood. By the virtue of her birth, she enjoys privileges  of a Nigerian citizen. In an interview with a Nigerian print media The Punch she described, Lagos as her home and stated in the interview that she was from a polygamous home. Da-Silva attended Ireti Grammar School for secondary school education and in bid to obtain a college degree proceeded to Lagos State University and eventually graduated with a B.Sc. degree from the institution of higher learning.

Career
Da-Silva in an interview disclosed, that her attraction to the Nigerian Yoruba movie industry began whilst in secondary school and subsequently she started, to get involved in school plays. Da-Silva In an interview with The Punch media press stated that she officially, debuted into the Nigerian Yoruba movie industry in 2004 through the help of Iyabo Ojo. Da-Silva's career as an actress rose to limelight after she, featured as notable characters in two movies; the first titled Wakati Meta by Wale Lawal and a movie titled  Omidan by Iyabo Ojo. 

Da-Silva in 2012, debuted her career as a movie producer with a movie titled Mama Insurance which featured Ayo Mogaji, Lanre Hassan, Iyabo Ojo, Ronke Ojo, and Doris Simeon.

Awards and nominations

Influence 
Da-Silva named, Bukky Wright as her role model in the Nigerian Yoruba movie industry and stated that she had influenced, her acting style significantly.

Personal life
Da-Silva is a Nigerian, by virtue of birth and a Togolese because her parents are citizens of Togo. Da-Silva has described, Lagos state as her home but maintains, she still has connections to her extended family in Togo. Da-Silva In 2013 converted from Christianity to Islam.

Selected filmography
Ore l’ore Nwoto (2007) 
Omidan 
Desire
Itanje
Mama Insurance
Alebu kan
Mawo’badan
Tasere
Mama Insurance

See also 
 List of Nigerian actresses

References

External links
 Liz Da-Silva Page

Living people
21st-century Nigerian actresses
Yoruba actresses
1978 births
Actresses in Yoruba cinema
Actresses from Lagos
Lagos State University alumni
Nigerian Muslims
Converts to Islam from Christianity
Nigerian former Christians
Nigerian people of Togolese descent
Nigerian film actresses
Nigerian film producers
Nigerian women film producers